Simon Herbert Howe (December 21, 1835 – May 11, 1911) was a Massachusetts businessman and politician who was the first mayor of Marlborough, Massachusetts, and a member of the Massachusetts House of Representatives.

Early life and family
Howe was born in Marlborough, Massachusetts, to Samuel (1800–1864) and Charlotte Howe (1800–1839). Howe was a direct descendant of John Howe (1602-1680) who arrived in Massachusetts Bay Colony in 1630 from Brinklow, Warwickshire, England, and settled in Sudbury, Massachusetts. Howe was also a descendant of Edmund Rice another early immigrant to Massachusetts Bay Colony Howe married Harriett A. Brigham on January 1, 1857. They had four children including a son, Louis P. Howe.

Howe died in Southborough, Massachusetts on May 11, 1911.

Business career
Howe was president of the S.H. Howe Shoe Company and the president of the Marlborough Savings Bank. When Marlborough became a city, Howe had an image of his own factory incorporated into the city seal, where it remains to this day.

Notes
Notes

Citations

External links

1835 births
1911 deaths
American Unitarians
American bankers
Mayors of Marlborough, Massachusetts
Members of the Massachusetts Governor's Council
Republican Party members of the Massachusetts House of Representatives
People from Marlborough, Massachusetts
19th-century American politicians
19th-century American businesspeople